Institute of strategic studies or Center for strategic studies is used by various research institutions around the world. They include:

 The Strategic Studies Institute (SSI), the U.S. Army's institute for strategic and national security research and analysis
 International Institute for Strategic Studies
 The Institute of Strategic Studies, Islamabad (ISSI), strategic studies think tank based in Islamabad, Pakistan
 Centre for Strategic Studies New Zealand
 Center for Strategic Studies
 Center for Strategic Research (Iran), an Iranian think tank based in Tehran
 Center for Strategic Research (Russia), a Russian public policy think tank based in Moscow